Gautam Shome may refer to:

 Gautam Shome Sr. (Gautam Kumar Shome, born 1960), Indian cricketer
 Gautam Shome Jr. (born 1963), Indian cricketer